Peccioli is a comune (municipality) in the Province of Pisa in the Italian region Tuscany, located about  southwest of Florence and about  southeast of Pisa.

Main sights
Pieve di San Varano, most likely built between the end of the 11th and the beginning of the 12th century. It has a façade with five blind arcades and Lombard bands. The belltower, from 1885, inglobates remains of the medieval structure. The interior has a nave and two aisles: it houses canvasses from Jacopo Vignali, an 18th-century crucifix, a Madonna with Child and Saints by Neri di Bicci (1484) and two paintints from the 13th century Pisan school.
Chapel of Santa Caterina, including a late 15th-century tabernacle frescoed by Benozzo Gozzoli when he had moved in  the area to escape plague.

References

External links

 On-line book about History of Peccioli (in Italian)

Cities and towns in Tuscany